Paul Steele (born December 5, 1957 in New Westminster, British Columbia) is a Canadian international rower, who was a member  of the Canadian men's eights team that won the gold medal at the 1984 Summer Olympics in Los Angeles, California, United States. The rowing team was inducted into the BC Sports Hall of Fame in 1985, and the Canadian Olympic Hall of Fame in 2003.

He was also a member of the Canadian men's eight rowing team for the 1988 Summer Olympics in Seoul, South Korea. They placed 6th in the finals.

References

External links 
 Athlete profile at the Canadian Olympic Committee website

1957 births
Living people
Olympic rowers of Canada
Canadian male rowers
Rowers at the 1984 Summer Olympics
Rowers at the 1988 Summer Olympics
Olympic gold medalists for Canada
Sportspeople from British Columbia
Olympic medalists in rowing
Medalists at the 1984 Summer Olympics
Commonwealth Games medallists in rowing
Commonwealth Games gold medallists for Canada
Pan American Games medalists in rowing
Pan American Games bronze medalists for Canada
Rowers at the 1983 Pan American Games
Rowers at the 1986 Commonwealth Games
Medalists at the 1983 Pan American Games
Medallists at the 1986 Commonwealth Games